In crystallography, a diffraction standard, or calibration crystal, is a crystal used to calibrate an X-ray spectrometer to an absolute X-ray energy scale. Quartz or silicon crystals are typically used. There are also reports of crystals of silver behenate or silver stearate having been used for this purpose.

External links
 http://www.gwyndafevans.co.uk/thesis-html/node85.html
 http://www.ccp14.ac.uk/solution/calibration/index.html
 http://bigbro.biophys.cornell.edu/documents/SAX_Calibrants/saxs_sphere.html

Measurement
X-ray crystallography